Qo or QO may refer to:

 Aeromexpress (IATA airline designator QO)
 Origin Pacific Airways (IATA airline designator QO)
 QO, a line of electrical circuit breakers made by Square D
 Qoheleth, aka Ecclesiastes, a book of the Hebrew Bible
 quaestiō, Latin for "question", a possible origin of the question mark
 Quickoffice, a software package